A wake-up call (alarm call in the United Kingdom, morning call in east Asia) is a service provided by lodging establishments allowing guests to request a telephone call at a pre-specified time, thus causing the guest to wake up at that time. It is similar in concept to an alarm clock, but is instead conducted via a telephone. A similar concept is used by hotel establishments in Africa, where it is referred to as "Amka, Amka". 

The phrase has also been used to describe an alert someone may receive regarding the consequences of negative circumstances or dangerous behavior.

Wake-up calls are also used in aircraft crew rests during long-haul flights of to wake up resting flight attendants or pilots from their controlled rest.

See also
 Knocker-up

References

Wake-up call
Morning